Events in the year 1996 in Greece.

Incumbents

Events

 9 May – Greek President Konstantinos Stephanopoulos arrives in the United States for a visit to U.S. President Bill Clinton in Washington, D.C.

Deaths

 23 June – Andreas Papandreou, Prime Minister of Greece (born 1919)

References

 
Years of the 20th century in Greece
Greece
1990s in Greece
Greece